Fred Zechman (born c. 1945) is a former American football coach.  He served as the head football coach at New Mexico State University from 1983 to 1985, compiling a record of 9–24.  Zechman graduated from Capital University in Bexley, Ohio, where he played college football from 1963 to 1966.  He was the head football coach at Miami Trace High School in Washington Court House, Ohio from 1973 to 1978, tallying a mark of 55–6–1.  Zechman worked as an assistant football coach at Ohio State University under head coach Earle Bruce from 1979 to 1982.

Head coaching record

College

References

Year of birth missing (living people)
1940s births
Living people
Capital Comets football players
New Mexico State Aggies football coaches
Ohio State Buckeyes football coaches
High school football coaches in Ohio